The Marcy Avenue station is a station on the BMT Jamaica Line of the New York City Subway. Located at the intersection of Marcy Avenue and Broadway in Brooklyn, it is served by the J train at all times, the M train at all times except late nights, and the Z train during rush hours in the peak direction.

History 

Marcy Avenue opened on June 25, 1888 as a part of the Broadway Elevated, one of the first elevated lines in New York City. Trains traveled westbound to the Broadway Ferry terminal on the East River in Brooklyn and eastbound services ran to Canarsie (this routing is no longer used due to the later building of the Canarsie Line) and a connection over the Williamsburg Bridge to Delancey Street/Essex Street in Manhattan opened in 1908. In 1913, trains were extended farther down the newly opened Nassau Street Line to Chambers Street. A year later, a connection was built to allow Myrtle Avenue trains to run on the Broadway Elevated.

The Dual Contracts expansion projects radically changed operations at Marcy Avenue. A third track was added, allowing trains to run express, although the track remains as a stub-end at Marcy Avenue for storage and turn-arounds. The Contracts also provided for the merger of the Jamaica Line from Broadway Junction to 168th Street with the Broadway Elevated, in turn making the Broadway Elevated part of the Jamaica Line and giving trains three eastern terminals.

On April 13, 1954, the enlarged station platform at Marcy Avenue was opened, as well as the expanded stairway facilities. In 1982, the Urban Mass Transportation Administration gave a $66 million grant to the New York City Transit Authority. Part of the grant was to be used for the renovation of several subway stations, including Marcy Avenue. In 2002, the Metropolitan Transportation Authority announced that elevators would be installed at the Marcy Avenue station.

As part of the 2015–2019 Metropolitan Transportation Authority's Capital Program, station capacity enhancements will be made at the station. The project will assess the feasibility of widening and reconstructing the stairs at Havemeyer Street, widening the westerly outbound platform, and widening the platform level fare control areas to fit in an additional low-level turnstile. Design work started in April 2017 and will be finished in December 2017, with construction set to begin in April 2018. In December 2021, the MTA awarded a contract for the replacement of the Marcy Avenue station's elevators, to be completed by late 2023 or early 2024.

Station layout 

This station has two side platforms and three tracks and is the westernmost station on the Jamaica Line. The center track dead ends at the west end at a bumper block and is unusable for service. Both platforms have beige windscreens and red canopies with green frames that run along the entire length except for a section at the southeast (railroad south), where they have waist-high black steel fences. During the 1999 reconstruction of the Williamsburg Bridge, a temporary platform was erected over the center track for the station's use as a terminal station.

The 2005 artwork here is called A Space Odyssey by Ellsworth Ausby. It consists of stained glass windows depicting space travel on the platform windscreens.

Just west of this station, there is a short section of trackway continuing straight which once led to the Broadway Ferry Spur. As now configured, westbound trains run over the Williamsburg Bridge, connecting to the BMT Nassau Street Line in Manhattan. To the east, there are switches that are used to access the center express track, which is used by the J and Z trains in the peak direction weekday midday and rush hours.

Exits
All four fare control areas of the station are on platform level. As a result, there is no free transfer between directions. The primary ones, are elevated station houses adjacent to the platforms. Each station house has doors leading to the stairs and platform, turnstile bank, token booth, and two stairs and one ADA-accessible elevator to the street. The stairs from the Manhattan-bound station house go down to either northern corner of Marcy Avenue and Broadway while the stair from the Queens-bound station house go down to either southern corners. The elevators go down to either western corner of Marcy Avenue and Broadway, with the Queens-bound elevator on the southwest corner and the Manhattan-bound elevator on the northwest corner.

Both platforms have a HEET turnstile entrance/exit at their extreme west end that was added during a 1990s renovation. Each leads to a canopied staircase that goes down to either side of Broadway near Havemeyer Street.

In popular culture 

The home of the character Dave Stutler in the 2010 film The Sorcerer's Apprentice is located near this station. Stutler is also attacked by a wolf in this station.

The fictional neighborhood of "Little Wadiya", from the 2012 film The Dictator, is located near to this station. The choice may be related to the presence of the Hasidic Jewish Community in Williamsburg.

Flight of the Conchords are seen emerging from Marcy Avenue station singing the song Inner City Pressure during season 1, episode 2 of their eponymous TV show.

References

External links 

 
 Station Reporter — J Train
 Station Reporter — M Train
 The Subway Nut — Marcy Avenue Pictures
 MTA's Arts For Transit — Marcy Avenue (BMT Jamaica Line)
 Marcy Avenue entrance from Google Maps Street View
 Havemeyer Street entrance from Google Maps Street View
 Platforms from Google Maps Street View

BMT Jamaica Line stations
1888 establishments in New York (state)
New York City Subway stations in Brooklyn
Railway stations in the United States opened in 1888
Williamsburg, Brooklyn